Rama at Sita – The Musical is a 1999 full-length Filipino musical in the Tagalog language. It is an adaptation of the 1980 Filipino rock opera ballet by three National Artists Bienvenido Lumbera, Ryan Cayabyab, and Alice Reyes entitled, "Rama, Hari", based on the Indian epic Ramayana topbilled by Kuh Ledesma and Basil Valdez. The production was directed by Leo Rialp and is considered the most expensive theatrical production in the Philippines to date.

Productions
Rama at Sita – The Musical premiered on February 4, 1999, at the University Theater in Quezon City under the stage direction and stage design by Leo Rialp and the musical direction of Danny Tan. The choreographer was Agnes Locsin. The musical starred Ariel Rivera and Lani Misalucha in the title roles, with Jaya as Surpanakha and Robert Seña as Ravana. The musical is one of the most expensive ever produced in Philippine entertainment history with a budget of Php 40 million, and the actor Franco Laurel was among the producers. Philippine fashion pillar Patis Tesoro served as costume designer.

Synopsis

While Rama is supposed to inherit the throne of his father King Dasaratha of Ayuthaya, his father's favorite wife Queen Kaikeyi pressured Dasaratha to fulfill the latter's promise to grant her two wishes. Kaikeyi wished for her son  Bharata to become king and to send Rama into exile along with his loyal brother Lakshmana. In their pursuits, they have met Sita, and the evil siblings Ravana and Surpanakha who wanted to lure the couple into becoming their partners.

Musical numbers

 Act I
 Sadyang Pinagtagpo (Vishvamitra, Ensemble)
 Huwag Takasan (Rama)
 Kaya Ko (Bharata)
 Halina sa Mithila (Rama, Lakshmana, Vishnamitra, Indrajit, Janaka, Ensemble)
 O Kay Dami ng Babae (Lakshmana, Ensemble)
 Sana siya na nga (Rama, Sita, Lakshmana)
 Iisa ang Tibok/Awit ng Pagsinta (Rama, Sita, Vishnamitra, Ensemble)
 Ang Sumpa ng Patay (Dasaratha)
 Tayo Na, Nariyan Na (Rama, Sita, Lakshmana, Kaikeyi, Dasaratha, Bharata, Ensemble)
 Ako'y Iyong Iyo (Rama, Sita)

 Act II
 Buktot, Ako'y Buktot/Harot, Ako'y Harot (Surpanakha, Ravana, Maricha)
 Type Kita, Rama (Surpanakha)
 Ginoong Ermitanyo (Sita, Ravana)
 Tingnan Mo ang Aking Byuti (Surpanakha)
 Kaya N'yo Bang Tumagal (Surpanakha as Sita)
 Magbalik Ka Na Mahal (Sita)
 Tagistis ng Ulan (Rama)
 Sadyang Pinagtagpo/Huwag Takasan [Reprise] (Rama, Vishnamitra, Ensemble)

Characters

Rama – crown prince of Ayuthaya; son of Dasaratha and husband of Sita
Sita – princess of Mithila; daughter of King Janaka; wife of Rama
Ravana – evil king of Lanka
Surpanakha – sister of King Ravana
Lakshmana – brother of Rama
Dasaratha – king of Ayuthaya
Kaikeyi – favorite wife of King Dasaratha
Bharata – son of Queen Kaikeyi; regent of Ayuthaya

Cast

Awards and nominations

References

Philippine musicals
1999 musicals